Métlili is a district in Ghardaïa Province, Algeria. It was named after its capital, Métlili.

Municipalities
The district is further divided into 2 municipalities:
Métlili
Sebseb

References

Districts of Ghardaïa Province